is an underground metro station on the Sendai Subway Namboku Line in Taihaku-ku, Sendai, Miyagi Prefecture, Japan.

Lines

Station layout
Nagamachi-Minami Station is an underground station with a single island platform serving two tracks.

Platforms

History
Nagamachi-Minami Station opened on July 15, 1987.

Passenger statistics
In fiscal 2015, the station was used by an average of 11,762 passengers daily.

Surrounding area
Taihaku Ward Office
Nagamachi-Minami Bus Pool
The Mall Sendai Nagamachi
Lala Garden Nagamachi
Sendai City Tomizawa Site Museum
Sendai City Southern Developmental Disorder Consultation Support Center (Nambu Archl)

References

External links

 

Railway stations in Sendai
Sendai Subway Namboku Line
Railway stations in Japan opened in 1987